An eight-member IHSAA-sanctioned athletic located within Clay, Daviess, Greene and Sullivan Counties in Southwest and West Central Indiana. North Central (Farmersburg) joined in 2010 with the folding of the Tri-River Conference. Prior to that time, Clay City, Linton Stockton, Shakamak, and Union (Dugger) also participated in the Tri-River Conference concurrently while playing in the SWIAC. The conference was originally formed in 1939, but information on early membership between then and 1958 is incomplete.

Membership

 Bloomfield played concurrently in the SWIAC and Blue Chip Conference from 1968 to 1985.
 Clay City and Shakamak were both concurrently in the SWIAC and TRC from joining the SWIAC until the TRC's demise in 2010. Linton-Stockton joined the TRC in 1991 while playing simultaneously in both leagues until 2010.

Former Members

 Loogootee and Shoals played concurrently in the SWIAC and MCC 1939–43.
 Shoals played concurrently in the SWIAC and Lost River Conference from 1971 to 1974, and in the SWIAC and BCC from 1977 to 1979.
 Union played in the SWIAC and TRC concurrently from 1974 to 2010.
 Union was closed as a public school in 2014, however, a charter school was formed the same year carrying the history of the school. The new Union played as a non-IHSAA independent until 2018, when it joined the Southern Roads Conference.

State championships

Bloomfield (1)

 1998 Girls Basketball (A)

Clay City (0)

Eastern Greene (0)

Linton Stockton (3)
1910 Track and Field 
2016 Football (1A)
2020 Girls Basketball (2A)
2021 Girls Basketball (2A)

North Central (0)

North Daviess (1)
2022 Boys Basketball (A)

Shakamak (2)

 2008 Baseball (A)
 2014 Baseball (A)

Union (Dugger) (0)

White River Valley (0)

References

Resources
 IHSAA Conferences
 IHSAA Directory

Indiana high school athletic conferences
High school sports conferences and leagues in the United States